Matakawau Point is a rural settlement on the east side of the Āwhitu Peninsula and west side of the Manukau Harbour in the Auckland Region of New Zealand. The mouth of Matakawau Creek is south of Matakawau Point.

Demographics
Matakawau Point is part of the larger Āwhitu statistical area.

Matakawau Point had a population of 102 at the 2018 New Zealand census, an increase of 33 people (47.8%) since the 2013 census, and an increase of 18 people (21.4%) since the 2006 census. There were 51 households, comprising 54 males and 48 females, giving a sex ratio of 1.12 males per female. The median age was 55.2 years (compared with 37.4 years nationally), with 12 people (11.8%) aged under 15 years, 6 (5.9%) aged 15 to 29, 54 (52.9%) aged 30 to 64, and 33 (32.4%) aged 65 or older.

Ethnicities were 97.1% European/Pākehā, 11.8% Māori, and 2.9% Pacific peoples. People may identify with more than one ethnicity.

Although some people chose not to answer the census's question about religious affiliation, 52.9% had no religion, 41.2% were Christian and 2.9% had Māori religious beliefs.

Of those at least 15 years old, 18 (20.0%) people had a bachelor's or higher degree, and 21 (23.3%) people had no formal qualifications. The median income was $25,400, compared with $31,800 nationally. 9 people (10.0%) earned over $70,000 compared to 17.2% nationally. The employment status of those at least 15 was that 36 (40.0%) people were employed full-time, 12 (13.3%) were part-time, and 3 (3.3%) were unemployed.

Notes

Populated places around the Manukau Harbour
Populated places in the Auckland Region